Haryana, formed on 1 November 1966, is a state in North India. For the administrative purpose, Haryana is divided into 6 revenue divisions which are further divided into 22 districts. For Law and Order maintenance, it is divided into 5 Police Ranges and 4 Police Commissionerates.

Administrative divisions

Civil administration and revenue divisions

Administration of Haryana is divided into Revenue divisions composed of districts. Districts are further subdivided in to tehsils of the revenue administration and the Community development blocks for the development work.

Haryana has 6 administrative divisions, 22 districts, 73 sub-divisions, 93 revenue tehsils, 50 sub-tehsils, 142 community development blocks, 154 cities and towns, 7,030 villages and 6234 villages panchayats.

Engineering divisions

Electricity distribution zones 
Haryana Power Generation Corporation is responsible for producing and procuring power, and following two Government of Haryana PSUs are responsible for the distribution of electricity to the consumers and industries in the south and north zone respectively:

 Dakshin Haryana Bijli Vitran Nigam, south zone distributor.
 Uttar Haryana Bijli Vitran Nigam, north zone distributor.

Irrigation commands 
There are 6 command areas based on the systems of arterial supply canal and its end user branches and feeders.

 Bhakra Canal Command: Fed by Sutlej river, controls Bhakra Canal network within northern Haryana along Punjab border in the districts of Kaithal, northern Jind (Narwana), Sirsa, Fatehabad, parts of Hisar (down to Hisar city).
 Yamuna Canal Command: Fed by Western Yamuna Canal, controls this network within northeastern, east and central Haryana in the districts of Karnal, Jind, Rohtak, Hansi-I area of Hisar, Tosham, Bhiwani, Jhajjar, Sonepat, Panipat, and Karnal.
 Siwani Canal Command: Fed by Western Yamuna Canal command, covers Siwani, Isharwal, Jhumpa areas of Bhiwani district.
 Jui Canal Command: Fed by Western Yamuna Canal command, covers narrow tract of Kairu and Jui in Bhiwani district.
 Loharu Canal Command: Fed by Western Yamuna Canal command, covers districts of Charkhi Dadri and Loharu and Bahal areas of Bhiwani.
 JNL Canal Command: Fed by Western Yamuna Canal command, covers districts of Rewari and Mahendragarh.
 Gurugaon Canal Command: Fed by Western Yamuna Canal command, covers tract of Gurugaon, Nuh, Ferozepur Jhirka, Faridabad city, etc.
 Agra Canal Command: Directly fed by Yamuna river, covers narrow tract of Ballabhgarh and Palwal district.

Police divisions

Police commissionerates
Police commissionerates of Haryana, total 4 in number, are as follows (c. January 2022):

Police ranges

Police ranges of Haryana, total 5 in number, each headed by an officer not below the rank of ADG of Police reporting to the Director General of Police, are as follows (c. September 2018):

Electoral divisions

Lok Sabha

For electing the national-level Government of India, there are 10 Lok Sabha constituencies in Haryana. Current Lok Sabha constituencies in Haryana are: Ambala, Bhiwani–Mahendragarh, Faridabad, Gurgaon, Hisar, Karnal, Kurukshetra, Rohtak, Sirsa, and Sonipat.

Vidhan sabha

For electing the state-level Government of Haryana, there are 90 Vidhan Sabha constituencies of Haryana Legislative Assembly, of which 17 are reserved constituencies for the scheduled castes.

Forests and wildlife divisions

Principal Chief Conservator of Forests head the Forests Department, Haryana, there are separate two divisions each for wildlife and forests:

Forests zones
There are 2 Forests Protections zone and 4 Forests circles/divisions, i.e. 2 circles per zone.

 Forests Protection zone-1: Panchkula, covers geographical northern half of Haryana. It consists of North Forests Circle/Division which covers northeast geographical quadrant of Haryana including Shivalik Hills and down to Sonipat and West Forests Circle/Division which Covers northwest geographical quadrant of Haryana including Sirsa, Hisar, Jind.
 Forests Protection zone-2: Based at Gurugram, covers geographical southern half of Haryana. It consists of Central Forests Circle/Division which covers central geographical quadrant of Haryana including Rohtak, Jhajjar, Charkhi Dadri, Bhiwani, Mahendragarh etc. and South Forests Circle/Division which covers geographical South Haryana including Faridabad, Nuh, Palwal, etc.

Wildlife areas
 Wildlife zones
There are two Wildlife zones, each headed by the Chief Conservator of Wildlife.
 Wildlife North zone: Based at Panchkula, covers geographical northern half of Haryana including Shivalik Hills to Sirsa, to Hisar to Rohtak.
 Wildlife South zone: Based at Gurugram, covers geographical southern half of Haryana including Charkhi Dadri, Bhiwani, Mahendragarh, Nuh, palwal, Gurugram, Faridabad, etc.

 Wildlife corridors
 Sariska-Delhi leopard corridor
 Sahibi wildlife corridor (planned)
 Shivalik wildlife corridor
 Yamuna wildlife corridor

 National parks and protected areas
See List of national parks and wildlife sanctuaries of Haryana.

Geographical regions

Haryana is bounded by the Shivalik (Himalaya's foothills) in the northeast, Yamuna in the east which enters Haryana in the northeast from Shivalik hills and it forms the natural border between Haryana and Uttar Pradesh, Aravalli in South Haryana which also includes Mewat and Ahirawal as well as parts of Vedic era region of Braj and Matsya, Bagar tract in the west along the Haryana-Rajasthan border, and in the north it is bounded by the channel of Ghaggar River (paleo Sarasvati River, including its tributary present day Chautang which is paleo channel of vedic era Drishadvati river) along Haryana-Punjab border.

Regions, clockwise from northeast, are as follows.

Shivalik in northeast

Areas of Haryana lying in Siwalik Hills range, i.e. northern parts of Panchkula and Yamunanagar district as well as Naraingarh tehsil of Ambala.

Yamuna basin in east

GT Road belt

GT Road belt is the geographical area on either side of the Grand Trunk Road from Delhi to Ambala. Upland areas around Indri north of Karnal is called Nardak. The road itself lies inside the unflooded Bangar area roughly along the demarcation between Yamuna bangar and Yamuna Khadir. GT Road is a new term for the ancient vedic era route which was later rehabilitated by Ashoka (268 to 232 BCE), Harsha (c. 590–647 CE), and Sher Shah Suri (1486 – 22 May 1545), etc.

Yamuna Bangar 

Yamuna Bangar in Yamuna basin is the upland area of Haryana which does not get flooded. Northern end of it is called Nardak.

Deshwal

Deshwal region of Haryana covers the districts of Panipat, Sonipat, Rohtak, Jhajjar, southern part of Jind. Sometimes, its definition is widened to include the southwest Kurukshetra, southern Kaithal, non-bagar tracts of Hisar and Bhiwani as well as Charkhi Dadri. Deshwal region covers both bangar and Khadir areas. The area within Deshwal to the east of Grant Trunk Road is called Deshwali khadir which gets flooded and the unflooded area to the west of Grant Trunk Road in Deshwal region is called Deshwali khadir. Comparatively, a much larger area of Deshwal in Haryana is bangar (unflooded upland) area.

Nardak

Nardak ("high tract" or bangar) is a region in western and northern parts of Karnal district in northeastern area of Haryana state of India. All definitions of this area include Assandh, Nissing and Nilokheri Community Development Blocks (CDB) in western and northern parts of Karnal district, and it ends in the north of Karnal city at Indri where Nardak, Khadir and Bangar areas of Yamuna river basin meet. Nardak is a title of the Kurukshetra from the words "Nirdukh", meaning the "painless". Nardak is the high tract, hence a sub-region of bangar (unflooded) region of Yamuna river.

During the Vedic era, it was part of Kuru janapada, hence presently has many Mahabharata era tirthas which are part of the wider 48 Kos Parikrama of Kurukshetra. Presently, Nardak area lies on either side of Grand Trunk Road.

Yamuna Khadir

Khadir (खादर) is any low-lying floodplains of a river usually relatively narrower compared to unflooded bangar area. Khadar areas are prone to flooding and sometimes include portions of former river-beds that became available for agriculture when a river changes course. It is moisture retentive and sticky when wet. Khadir soil consists of new alluvial soil relatively higher in new silt content from the river, gets replenished with each flooding cycle, and is often very fertile. Haryana has two such floodplains, Yamuna Khadir and Nali.

Yamuna Khadir, or simply Khadir, is a fertile floodland area lying between the Yamuna river and the Grand Trunk Road, i.e. eastern parts of Sonepat, Panipat, Karnal and Kurukshetra as well as southeastern Yamunanagr district.

Aravalli in South Haryana: Ahirwal, Braj and Mewat 
Areas of Haryana lying in Aravalli hills range mostly fall within Ahirwal and Mewat regions.

 Vedia era janapada regions are:
 Braj includes a small part of Haryana, such as Punhana and Hodal
 Kuru including Gurugram and Faridabad, Palwal in Aravali area. Kuru also extended along Yamuna to Kurukshetra.
 Matsya Narnaul, Rewari, Mahendergarh, Kanina, Nuh, etc. which also corresponds with the present day Ahirawal and Mewat regions.
 Pre-Islamic Hindu-Rajput era regions: These areas were part of Alwar kingdom ruled by Kachhwaha Rajputs who claim descent from Kusha - the eldest son of Rama. These areas were adjacent Dhundhar, also called Jaipur region under Jaipur kingdom, to Dhundhar's the east and northeast side.
 Bighoto: Historic region which covered present day districts of Rewari and Mahendragarh.
 Chandain: Historic region, which covered 12 villages of Taoru, was a subdivision of the bigger Bighoto region, which in turn was part of Alwar State. This region overlaps with and also lies entirely within Mewat.
 Dhundhoti: Historic region which covered present day districts of Gurugram has its seat of power at Garhi Harsaru.
 Medieval and present day regions:
 Ahirwal: Ahir dominated areas such as Narnaul, Rewari, Kanina, Mahendergarh and parts of Faridabad district
 Mewat: narrow tract in Haryana in Nuh district from Nuh city ion the north to Ferozepur Jhirka in the south and till Ujina and Uttawar in the east. Mewat, Meo-dominated area, covers much larger area which spans the contiguous area in Rajasthan.

Bagar in west 

Bagar tract or Bagad (बागड़), from "Bar" meaning the dry country, refers to the sandy tract of north-western India and eastern parts of current Pakistan bordering India. In Haryana, it covers southern parts of Sirsa district (earlier known as Bhattiana), and western villages of Fatehabad, Hisar, Bhiwani and Charkhi Dadri districts. in Rajasthan on the west of border of Haryana, it covers parts of tehsils of Ganganagar; Bhadra, Nohar in Hanumangarh district; Taranagar tehsil in Churu district. Bhattiana, a historical region ruled by the Bhati Rajputs in the past, is a part of bagar tract covering Sirsa and Fatehabad district. Chak, type of villages, were established in the northern part of this tract along the canal network during British raj. Smaller settlements in the farms are called dhani.

Sarasvati-Ghaggar-Chautang basin in north 

This area lies in the Ghaggar-Chautang doab in northwestern Haryana bounded by Narvana, Hansi, Hisar, and Ellanabad.

Sarasvati-Ghaggar basin

Bangar is the area which remains unflooded and Nali (also called Khadir) is area which gets flooded during the rainy season.

Sarasvati-Ghaggar bangar

These are areas along either side of Ghaggar, which does not get flooded. It lie in the district of Jind (Narwana), Fatehabad, north Hisar, Sirsa.   This basin has numerous Sarasvati-Indus Valley civilization sites.

Nali khadir or Ghaggar khadir 

Nali area, or simply Nali (नाळी), is the fertile floodland Khadir area in Fatehabad and Sirsa districts between the Ghaggar river and the southern limits of the Saraswati palaeochannel depression that gets flooded during the rains. Parts of this also lie in Narwana (north Jind region). Kunal is an important Sarasvati-Indus Valley civilization site on the paleo bank of Sarasvati (Ghaggar) river.

Drishadvati-Chautang basin

This area lies in the Ghaggar-Chautang doab in northwestern Haryana.

Chautang bangar 

The area which get flooded along and either side of Chautang include area in the tehsils of Jind, Hansi, Hisar, Bawani Khera, Siwani,

Chautang khadir 

The area which get flooded along Chautang include low lying areas of Jind, Hansi, Hisar. This is the paleo channel of Drishadvati. The Sarasvati-Indus Valley civilization sites on the paleo channel of Drishadvati are Rakhigarhi, Lohari Ragho, Banawali, Sothi (8 km southwest of Nohar.

Industrial zones and corridors
HSIIDC has developed at least 11 specialised "Industrial Clusters and Theme Parks", 24 "Industrial Estate (IE)" (each wit an area larger than at least 1500 acres),  "Industrial Model Township (IMT)" (smaller than 1500 acres), and an IT Park (denoted by double asterisk or star symbol). Haryana has at least 24 IEs, 7 IMT, an IT Park, and several Integrated Multimodel Logistics Hubs (IMLH) in the state of Haryana.

 Industrial corridors

 Amritsar Delhi Kolkata Industrial Corridor 
 Delhi–Mumbai Industrial Corridor

 Industrial clusters and theme parks

 Textile Hub, Panipat
 IIDC Narwana in Jind
 Food Park, Saha
 Growth Centre, Saha
 Footwear Park, Bahadurgarh
 Apparel Park, Barhi
 Theme Park, Kundli
 Electronic Hardware Technology Park, Kundli
 EPIP, Kundli
 Food Park, Rai
 Mega Food Park, Rai

 Industrial estates and townships
See the list of 30+ industrial estates and townships spread across Haryana.

Interfluve 

Doab (interfluve) is land lying between two confluent rivers

Extant doab

Sarsuti-Ghaggar doab: It is the only extant doab which covers the entire length of northern border of Haryana with Punjab, i.e. districts of Panchkula, eastern Yamunanagar, Ambala, northern Kurukshetra, Kaithal, northern Jind, northern Fatehabad and northern Sirsa.

Palaeo doab

Sarasvati-Yamuna doab / Ghaggar-Yamuna doab:   Almost all of the northern border of Haryana is roughly defined by the course of present-day seasonal Sarsuti river, which is one of many Palaeochannel of Sarasvati river. It is now the tributary of present-day Ghaggar river, which is currently the most volumnous or main ramnant channel of Sarasvati river. Almost all of the eastern border of Haryana is roughly defined by the course of Yamuna river. Area between the ancient Sarasvati (with its several palaeochannelin Haryana, including Sarsuti and Ghaggar, and the largest paleo tributary Dhrisdhavati) and Yamuna is called the Sarasvati-Yamuna doab. According to the paleo studies, the earliest paleo channel of Sarasvati flowed southeast collecting Sahibi river and converging with Yamuna.     This Sarasvati-Yamuna doab covered the area of districts of Panchkula, Ambala, Yamunanagr, Kurukshetra, Kaithal, parts of Jind, Karnal, Panipat, Sonepat, Rohtak, Jhajjar and Gurugram. It remains a matter of further study if Sarasvati ever confluenced with Ganges-Yamuna at Prayagraj as eluded to in the Hindu texts, if this hypothesis if found to be true, Sarasvati would have also flowed through Rwari, Fridabad and Nuh districts of Haryana and would have collected Chambal and Betwa rivers as its tributories. Since Sarasvati and Yamuna no longer confluence, this palaeo Sarasvati-Yamuna doab no longer exists. Only extant doab in Haryana is Sarsuti-Ghaggar doab. Palaeo Sarasvati-Yamuna doab could be subdivided into the following doabs of Drishadvati-Sahibi doab, Drishadvati-Sahibi doab and Sahibi-Yamuna doab.
Sarasvati-Drishadvati doab / Ghaggar-Drishadvati doab:   This palaeo doab covered the area lying between Ghaggar river (palaeochannel of Sarasvati) and the palaeochannel Drishadvati river which confluenced in Hanumangarh district immediately northwest of Haryana. This doab area included entire Northern Haryana on Haryana-Punjab, i.e. districts of Panchkula, Ambala, Yamunanagar, Kurukshetra, Kaithal, Jind, northern part of Hisar, Fatehabad and Sisra.
Drishadvati-Sahibi doab / Ghaggar-Sahibi doab:   This palaeo doab covered the area of northwestern Haryana, i.e. districts of Sirsa, Fatehabad, Hisar, Bhiwani, Charkhi Dadri and Mahendragarh.
Sahibi-Yamuna doab:   This palaeo doab covered the area lying between Sahibi river and Yamuna. This doab area included South Haryanam i.e. districts of Rewari, southern Gurugam, Southern Faridabad, Nuh and Palwal.

Language zones

 Hindi (Central Zone)
 Haryanvi language 
 Deswali (dialect)(also called Deshwali, Desari and Desaru, spoken in Deswal region covering districts of Rohtak, Sonipat and  Jhajjar.
 Standard Haryanvi (dialect) spoken in Jind, Hisar, Hansi, Bhiwani, Tosham, Charki Dadri, Meham and Gohana.
 Jatu (dialect) (dialect of the Jats) sub-dialect of deswali, spoken by Jats and Rors in low-lying khadir flood planes on western banks of Yamuna in Panipat, Karnal,Kuruksehtra and Yamunanagar districts.
 Bangru (dialect) (also called Banagaru, Hariani & Haryiani, spoken in areas between Khadar region, Bagar region and deswali region in Kaithal District, Pehowa, Tohana, Barwala, Narwana and Assandh.
 Bagri language spoken in (Bagar region of sandy western Haryana covering Sirsa, Ellenabad, Fatehabad, Adampur, Balsamand, Siwani and Bahal in Haryana.
 Sansi language (distinct language of Sansi nomads, with influence of Rajasthani, Punjabi, Haryanvi and Hindi languages)
 Mewati language is spoken in Nuh District, Sohna and part of Palwal District.
 Ahirwati dialect of Mewati language is spoken in Rewari, Mahendragarh, Narnaul, Loharu, Matanheil and parts of Gurugram District like Pataudi and Manesar.
 Rangri dialect is another type for Haryanvi language used by Haryanvi-Muslim migrants living in Pakistan.
 Braj Bhasha in Faridabad and Palwal districts.
 Pahari languages in hill areas of Ambala, Panchkula and Yamuna Nagar districts.
 Punjabi languages
 Puadhi dialect is spoken in districts of Panchkula District, Ambala District and parts of Kuruksehtra District like Shahbad Markanda.
 Malwai dialect is spoken in northern Sirsa District which includes Mandi Dabwali, Kalanwali and Odhan. It also spoken in Ratia Tehsil of Fatehbad District.
 Rathi dialect is spoken in central Sirsa District and northern Faridabad district.

Martial zones

The modern military history commenced with British colonial rule when George Thomas established modern European style army in 1798 to 1801, and later Colonel James Skinner (1778 – 4 December 1841) the Anglo-Indian military adventurer in India founded 1st Skinner's Horse and 3rd Skinner's Horse at Asigarh Fort at Hansi in 1803 which is now part of the Indian Army.

Military zones

 Current military stations

 Indian Army
 Ambala Cantonment
 Hisar Military Station
 Indian Air Force
 Ambala AFS
 Faridabad Logistics AFS
 Gurugram store
 Sirsa AFS
 Indian Navy
 Gurugram IMAC

 Defunct British Raj cantonments

 Asigarh Fort (Prithviraj Chauhan, George Thomas, Skinner)
 Karnal Cantonment (British raj)
 Bharawas (Company rule)
 Jharsa (Begum Samru)

 Defunct princely state garrisons (^ denotes abolished in 1858)

 Jat Raja (Hindu-Sikh) 
 Buria of Jat Sikh
 Balramgarh^ of Hindu Raja Nahar Singh
 Jind State of Phulkian Jat Sikh
 Kaithal State of Phulkian Jat Sikh
 Kalsia of Jat Sikh
 Kapurthala State (Narwana) of Phulkian Jat Sikh
 Pathan Nawab (Muslim)
 Bahadurgarh^ of Muslim Pathan
 Dujana^ of Yusufzai Pathan Muslim
 Jhajjar^ of Pathan Muslim
 Loharu State of Pathan Muslim

Para-military zones
This is a partial list, please help expand.

 Border Security Force 
 Hisar BSF Camp
 Central Industrial Security Force (CISF)
 Mandawar CISF, Sohna
 Central Reserve Police Force (CRPF)
 Hisar CRPF Camp
 National Security Guard (NSG) at Manesar
CRPF CAMP KHEWRA(SONIPAT)

Tourist and archaeological zones
Haryana State Directorate of Archaeology & Museums and Haryana Tourism are responsible for archaeology and tourism in Haryana respectively.

 Highest point 
 National monuments
 State monuments
 Indus-Sarasvati civilisation sites
 Monuments and memorials
 Culture
 Dams
 Forts
 Lakes
 Mountains
 Museums
 Music
 Temples
 Tourist attractions
 Other

Transport

Aviation zones
Haryana has 6 civil and 2 military aviation zones / airports. See airports in Haryana.

 Civil

 Bhiwani Airport
 Gurugram Airstrip
 Hisar Airport
 Karnal Airport
 Narnaul Airport
 Pinjore Airport

 Military

 Ambala Air Force Station
 Sirsa Air Force Station

 National and state capitals

 Chandigarh Airport
 IGI Airport

Integrated multimodel logistics hubs
There are many existing and proposed Integrated Multimodel Logistics Hubs (IMLH) in the state of Haryana including the following existing IMLH with containerised road and rail facilities and/or air facilities (denoted by asterisk):

 Manesar road cargo and railway sliding for Maruti Suzuki on Western Peripheral Expressway.
 Nangal Choudhary IMLH on Delhi–Mumbai Industrial Corridor.
 Pinjore IMLH* for the fruits on Ambala Chandigarh Expressway. Bilaspur to be developed as spoke with railway sliding on the proposed Chandigarh-Yamunanagar rail line.
 Sonipat inland container depot and logistics park on Delhi-Chandigarh NH1. Kharkhoda Footwear IMLH in Sonipat under implementation with containerised road and rail cargo.

Road corridors 
 Expressways (EWay)
 National highways (BH)
 State highways (SH)
 Major district roads (MDR)
 Other district roads (ODR)

Railway zones and dedicated corridors 
Parts of the following 3 zones and their 5 subordinate divisions of Indian Railways fall within Haryana:

 Dedicated Freight Corridors

 Eastern Dedicated Freight Corridor
 Western Dedicated Freight Corridor

 Railway zones 
 North Western Railway zone
Bikaner railway division covers western and southern Haryana including Bhatinda-Dabwali-Hanumangarh line, Rewari-Bhiwani-Hisar-Bathinda line, Hisar-Sadulpur line and Rewari-Loharu-Sadulpur line.
 Jaipur railway division covers south-west Haryana including Rewari-Reengas-Jaipur line, Delhi-Alwar-Jaipur line and Loharu-Sikar line.
 Northern Railway zone 
Delhi railway division covers north and east and central Haryana including Delhi-Panipat-Ambala line, Delhi-Rohtak-Tohana line, Rewari–Rohtak line, Jind-Sonepat line and Delhi-Rewari line.
Ambala railway division covers north-east Haryana including Ambala-Yamunanagar line, Ambala-Kurukshetra line and UNESCO World Heritage Kalka–Shimla Railway. There are 2 Workshops in this division which falls within Haryana: Carriage & Wagon Workshop, Jagadhari and Carriage & Wagon Workshop, Kalka for narrow gauge.
 North Central Railway zone 
Agra railway division covers very small part of network in south-east Haryana which includes Palwal-Mathura line only.

See also

 History of Haryana
 List of districts of Haryana
 List of tehsils of Haryana
 List of Haryana-related lists
 Outline of Haryana

References